Modafen Futbol Kulübü is a Turkish association football club located in the Çekmeköy district of Istanbul, Turkey.

History 
The Club was established in 2011. The club has strong ties with Modafen Schools. After the establishment of the club in 2011, they promoted three times in row. 2014–15 season they participate amateur divisions but they relegated. In 2019–20 season they managed to promote one more time which means they promoted five times, relegated once, and lost chance to promote once at playoff game since they established.

The club gained professional status at the end of 2018-19 season after defeating 1877 Alemdağspor at play-offs of Regional Amateur League.

2019-20 season started like a disaster for the team. They were almost relegated but thanks to covid Turkish Football Federation canceled the leagues. 2020-21 season they were lucky again. 
2021-22 season the club relegated back to Regional Amateur League.

Stadium
Modafen plays their home games at Alemdağ Stadium.

Crest and colours

Crest

Modafen have had two main crests. The first version was original yellow and green colours and the second one current red and black.

Colours
The original colours of Modafen was yellow and green. Modafen Schools still use these colours. But the club changed their colours to red and black.

Support 
The fans are known as the "Modamen".

Rivalries
Because of having short history and playing in different levels each year, club does not have any serious rivalry.

Records
Although club has a shorter history, they managed to set some interesting records.

Modafen's biggest winning scoreline in a competitive match is 11–0, achieved against Kocamustafapaşa in 2015-16 season. Modafen's biggest loss was against Diyarbekir 6-0 in 2019-20. Other heavy defeats were a 5–1 against Leventspor and a 4–0 against Yenibosna in 2014–15 season and 4-0 against Yesilyurt in 2019-20 season

Modafen hold a 16-game clean sheet streak (where they did not permit their opponent to score). They also hold a 13-game streak of keeping a clean sheet at home.

Players

First team squad

League participations 
 Turkish Regional Amateur League: 2014–15,2016-2017, 2017-2018, 2018-2019
 Amatör Futbol Ligleri: 2011–2014,2015–16

Famous former players

References

External links 
Official website
Modafen FK on TFF.org

Football clubs in Istanbul
Association football clubs established in 2011
2011 establishments in Turkey